Kommander of Kaos is the second solo studio album released by Wendy O. Williams after her group, the Plasmatics, went on hiatus. The album was recorded in 1984 but not released until 1986. A live version of the Gene Simmons-penned "Ain't None of Your Business" appears on this album (the song previously appeared on her debut album).
Lead guitarist Michael Ray (guitarist),or M. ray, was previously invited by Gene Simmons to record tracks on the Creatures of the Night Kiss album,  and was later hired by Simmons  to play guitar solos on the WOW album. Michael Ray (guitarist) composed and arranged  music tracks on the Kommander of Kaos  album. "Hoy hey (Live to rock)", "Pedal to the Metal", "Goin Wild", "Fight for the Right" and "(Work that Muscle) F**k that Booty".
The Kommander of Kaos album has been re-released by several independent labels in recent years (such as Plasmatics Media and Powerage).

Track listing
"Hoy Hey (Live to Rock)" (Swenson, Ray)
"Pedal to the Metal" (Swenson, Ray, Smith)
"Goin' Wild" (Swenson, Ray)
"Ain't None of Your Business" (live) (Simmons, Vincent, Carr)
"Party" (Swenson, Beech)
"Jailbait" (Kilmister, Taylor, Clarke)	
"Bad Girl"	(Swenson, Beech)
"Fight for the Right"	(Swenson, Ray)
"(Work That Muscle) F**k That Booty" (Swenson, Ray)

Personnel
Wendy O. Williams – vocals
Michael Ray – guitar, background vocals
Greg Smith – bass guitar, background vocals
T.C. Tolliver – drums
Wes Beech – guitar

References

External links
 Official Site

Wendy O. Williams albums
1986 albums